Sable FC is a Cameroonian football club based in Batié. They are a member of the Cameroonian Football Federation.  Their home stadium is Stade de Batié and they are nicknamed the "San San Boys".

Honours
 Cameroon Première Division: 1
 1999.

 Cameroon Cup: 0
Runners-up: 2002, 2003.

Super Coupe Roger Milla: 1
 1999.

Performance in CAF competitions
CAF Champions League: 1 appearance
2000 - Group stage/Semi-finals

CAF Confederation Cup: 1 appearance
2004 - Group stage/Semi-finals

Football clubs in Cameroon
Association football clubs established in 1995
1995 establishments in Cameroon
Sports clubs in Cameroon
West Region (Cameroon)